Benjamin Banks may refer to:

Ben B. Banks (born 1932), American leader in The Church of Jesus Christ of Latter-day Saints
Benjamin Banks (cricketer) (born 1969), English cricketer
Benjamin Banks (violin maker) (1727–1795), English violin-maker